is a city in the southern part of Awaji Island in Hyōgo Prefecture, Japan.

Geography
The city of Minamiawaji occupies the southern third of Awaji Island. It is connected to Tokushima Prefecture to the south by the Ōnaruto Bridge, and is located facing the Kii Channel and the Gulf of Harima on the Seto Inland Sea. There are no large rivers in the city, but there are many agricultural ponds. In the eastern part of the city is Mt. Yuzuruha, the highest peak in Awaji Island with an elevation of 607.9 meters.

Surrounding municipalities 
Hyogo Prefecture
 Sumoto

Climate

Demographics
Per Japanese census data, the population of Minamiawaji has been declining steadily over the past 30 years.

History
The city of Minamiawaji is situated in ancient Awaji Province. It was ruled as part of Tokushima Domain during the Edo period. After the Meiji restoration, it became part of Mihara District, Hyōgo. The town of Yura was established with the creation of the modern municipalities system April 1, 1889. On April 29, 1955 it changed its name to Nandan. The city of Minamiawaji was established on January 11, 2005, from the merger of all four towns of the former Mihara District: Nandan, Mihara, Midori, and Seidan.

Government
Minamiawaji has a mayor-council form of government with a directly elected mayor and a unicameral city council of 20 members. Minamiawaji contributes one member to the Hyogo Prefectural Assembly. In terms of national politics, the city is part of Hyōgo 9th district of the lower house of the Diet of Japan.

Economy
The local economy is largely rural, and is based on agriculture and commercial fishing. Minamiawaji's soil and climate make it ideal for growing onions. As such, Awaji onions are renowned across Japan as sweet and delicious.

Education
Minamiawaji has 14 public elementary schools and four public middle schools operated by the city government and one public high school operated by the Hyōgo Prefectural Department of Education. There are also one private elementary school and one private middle school.  Kibi International University's Faculty of Regional Creation Agriculture and the Kobe University Faculty of Maritime Sciences International Maritime Education and Research Center Awaji Marine Training Facility are located in Minamiawaji.

Transportation

Railway 
Minamiawaji does not have any passenger rail service.

Highways 
  Kobe-Awaji-Naruto Expressway

Other
Jointly with Awaji and Sumoto, the city operates a low-cost electric bike rental scheme, designed to attract visitors to stay for more than one day in order to explore the island.

Local attractions
 Awaji Kokubun-ji, National Historic Site
 Naruto whirlpools, which form when the changing tidal currents are forced through the Naruto Strait.
 Mihara town in Minamiawaji is home to a puppet museum which houses numerous examples of locally crafted puppets. This art originated in the area.

Notable people from Minamiawaji 
Kiichiro Higuchi, general in the Imperial Japanese Army
Tokubei Kuroda, marine biologist
Shohé Tanaka, physicist
Ōuchi Hyōei, economist
Yoichirō Hirase, marine biologist
Shintarō Hirase, marine biologist
Kazuyuki Okitsu, voice actor

References

External links

 
 Minamiawaji City official website 

Cities in Hyōgo Prefecture
Port settlements in Japan
Populated coastal places in Japan
Minamiawaji, Hyōgo